Bedford High School is a public high school in the town of Bedford, New Hampshire, United States. The high school adjoins the town's Ross A. Lurgio Middle School (7th and 8th grades). The combined schools are situated on a  campus at 47 Nashua Road. The two schools share an 810-seat theatre, a 2000-seat gymnasium, a FieldTurf football field and a synthetic 400-meter track. The approximate cost for constructing this facility in combination with Lurgio was $50 million.

Bedford High School's mascot is the bulldog, which was determined from a polling by the 5th, 6th, 7th, and 8th graders in early 2006. The polling also determined the school colors, which are red, black, and silver.

Bedford's sports program was recognized as the 20th best in the nation by maxpreps.com in 2013–14.

The school employs a two-level system, which are the PSP level and the IB/Honors level. This was based on a general consensus taken in the fall of 2006. The school also offers rigorous Advanced Placement courses and IB courses for students. Bedford High was the first school in the state of New Hampshire to offer IB classes, and the first group of IB Diploma students graduated with the rest of the first senior class in June 2010. A total of 11 seniors earned the IB Diploma.

History
Before construction of the high school, Bedford's students were tuitioned to Manchester West High School, an arrangement that had been in place since 1923.

The high school began teaching in the 2007-2008 school year, with an enrollment of 550 students (freshmen and sophomores only). For the 2009-2010 year, the school accommodated all four classes (freshmen through seniors), and total enrollment reached 1,250 students. The first class to attend four years and graduate from Bedford High School was the class of 2011.

The first principal of the school, from 2007 to 2009, was George H. Edwards Jr., who was previously the principal at Bow High School in nearby Bow, New Hampshire. The current principal is Bob Jozokos.

Campus
BHS has a large theatre with seating for 820 people. The school provides choir, band, and art classes.  As an afterschool club, BHS Theatre Company does two to three productions a year, including musicals and straight plays.

Academics
As of 2022 the foreign languages offered include American Sign Language, French, Latin, and Spanish.

The BHS math team has, since its birth in 2009, attained 2nd place in the NH SMASH meet in 2012, and then 2nd again the next year in the next division.

Athletics
The BHS boys' tennis team won eight consecutive state titles from 2010 to 2017, the most consecutive state titles in NH boys' tennis history.

From April 13, 2012, to May 11, 2012, the BHS lacrosse team won 72 consecutive games, tied for third for the nation's most consecutive wins in boys' lacrosse history. In 2010, only their second varsity season, the team was runner-up in the state championship game, losing in overtime to Bow High School. The varsity program had three back-to-back Division II state titles for the 2011-2012, 2012-2013, and 2013-2014 seasons.

Other teams which have won state championships since the school's founding include football, cheerleading, golf, girls' swimming, soccer (both girls' and boys' teams), boys' wrestling, girls' basketball, girls' tennis, girls' track and boys' cross country (along with an individual Division 1 cross country state champion on the boys side).

Intersession
The three days before April Break (Spring Break) are known as Intersession. Students can choose from a wide range of activities from local hiking trips to a 13-day getaway to Italy

Notable alumni
Grant Lavigne, baseball player

References

Further reading

External links
Bedford High School official website
Bedford Hockey

Educational institutions established in 2007
Schools in Hillsborough County, New Hampshire
Public high schools in New Hampshire
Bedford, New Hampshire
2007 establishments in New Hampshire